Jed Macauley Ward (born 5 May 2003) is an English footballer who plays as a goalkeeper for Hungerford Town on loan from Bristol Rovers.

Club career
Ward joined local Bristol side Bradley Stoke United before being scouted at a local chess club and joining Bristol Rovers at the age of eight, joining the under-9 team. On 5 February 2021, Ward signed his first professional contract with the club aged 17.

On 9 May 2021, with Rovers already relegated, Ward made his professional debut on the final day of the season against Blackpool as they lost 1–0.

On 21 January 2022, Ward joined Southern League Premier Division South club Swindon Supermarine on a one-month loan deal, joining fellow Rovers youngsters Kieran Phillips and Tom Mehew at the club. Ward was recalled from his loan spell on 3 February.

On 17 February he joined Prescot Cables on loan for a month.  He returned to his parent club in early March.

On 12 August 2022, Ward joined National League South club Hungerford Town on a one-month youth loan deal. On 7 September 2022, this deal was extended until the end of the season. Whilst on loan with the club suffering from a broken hand, Ward signed a new contract with his parent club that would keep him at Rovers until 2024 with the option for a further extension.

International career
On 21 May 2021, the day after he turned 18, Ward was called up to the England U19 training camp, to be held at St George's Park.

Career Statistics

References

External links

2003 births
Living people
English footballers
Association football goalkeepers
Footballers from Bristol
Bristol Rovers F.C. players
Swindon Supermarine F.C. players
Prescot Cables F.C. players
Hungerford Town F.C. players
English Football League players
Southern Football League players
Northern Premier League players
National League (English football) players